Moridarow-e Pain (also Romanized as Morīdārow-e Pā’īn; also known as Morīdārow-e Soflá) is a village in Polan Rural District, Polan District, Chabahar County, Sistan and Baluchestan Province, Iran. At the 2006 census, its population was 56, in 7 families.

References 

Populated places in Chabahar County